Gullmarsplan metro station is a station on the Green line of the Stockholm metro and the Tvärbanan light rail line, located by Gullmarsplan in Johanneshov, Söderort. The station was opened for trams in 1946 after the construction of Skanstullsbron, and converted to Metro usage on 1 October 1950 (on the first line from Slussen south to Hökarängen). On 9 September 1951, an extension south to Stureby was opened.

Gullmarsplan is the busiest metro station in Söderort with 38,750 boarding passengers per day in 2019.

A new platform for the Blue line will be added to Gullmarsplan station, as part of the project to transfer the Hagsätra branch of the Green line to the Blue line. The new platform will also have an exit (with escalators and lifts) to Mårtensdal in Hammarby sjöstad. Opening is planned for 2030.

References

External links
Images of Gullmarsplan station

Green line (Stockholm metro) stations
Railway stations opened in 1946
Railway stations opened in 1950
1946 establishments in Sweden
1950 establishments in Sweden